William John Bulsiewicz is an American board-certified gastroenterologist and author known for his exploration of the relationship between the gut microbiome and plant-based nutrition.

Early life and education

Bulsiewicz was raised in a Jesuit-educated family. He received his B.S. in Chemistry from Vanderbilt University in 2002, and his M.D. from Georgetown University School of Medicine in 2006. He continued his education after medical school, receiving an M.S. in Clinical Investigation (MSCI) from Northwestern University in 2010, and a certificate in nutrition from Cornell University (online) in 2015.

Career
He was chief medical resident at Northwestern Memorial Hospital and chief gastroenterology fellow at the UNC Medical Center. He is board-certified in gastroenterology and internal medicine, and is affiliated with East Cooper Medical Center and Roper St. Francis Mount Pleasant Hospital. He has worked as a gastroenterologist for Lowcountry Gastroenterology Associates in Mount Pleasant, South Carolina, and is a member of the American Medical Association, American College of Physicians, and the American Gastroenterological Association.

Books

Bulsiewicz published Fiber Fueled in 2020, and The Fiber Fueled Cookbook Inspiring Plant-Based Recipes to Turbocharge Your Health in 2022. Both books promote a high-fiber plant-based diet that challenges the keto diet and the paleo diet. The books argue that gut health is the key to boosting metabolism, balancing hormones and reducing inflammation and the best way to do this is by consuming dietary fiber from a diverse variety of colourful plants. They also state that dietary fiber fuels gut microbiota which then create short-chain fatty acids..

Bulsiewicz notes that the populations in the Blue Zones consume predominantly plant-based diets, stating, "if you look at the healthiest populations on the planet in modern times, they’re in the five blue zones, and all five blue zones are 90 percent plant based. So, they are not necessarily vegan, but they are plant-predominant in a way where the meat is not the centerpiece. The plant is the centerpiece. The meat is the side show." He recommends fermented foods for gut health such as kimchi and sauerkraut.

Personal life
He follows a plant-based diet in his personal life, and lives with his wife and children in Charleston, South Carolina.

Publications
Books

Articles
Bulsiewicz, Will. "Why Gut? Why Now?." Georgetown University Medical Center Health Magazine, November 4, 2020.
Bulsiewicz, Will. "Is Gut-Lag Real? Here's The Science of How Travel Affects Your Gut." November 30, 2019.

References

External links

Will Bulsiewicz at PCRM (The Exam Room Podcast)
Will Bulsiewicz at Forks Over Knives
Will Bulsiewicz at richroll.com

21st-century American non-fiction writers
21st-century American physicians
American cookbook writers
American gastroenterologists
American health and wellness writers
American medical writers
American nutritionists
American veganism activists
Georgetown University School of Medicine alumni
High-fiber diet advocates
Living people
Northwestern University alumni
Plant-based diet advocates
Vanderbilt University alumni
Vegan cookbook writers
Year of birth missing (living people)